is a Japanese former cyclist. She competed in the women's points race at the 2000 Summer Olympics.

References

External links
 

1968 births
Living people
Japanese female cyclists
Olympic cyclists of Japan
Cyclists at the 2000 Summer Olympics
Place of birth missing (living people)
20th-century Japanese women
21st-century Japanese women